Pierre Marie, Marquis de Grave (27 September 1755 – 16 January 1823) was the French Minister of War in 1792, from 9 March to 9 May.

Notes

References

1755 births
1823 deaths
French marquesses
French Ministers of War
18th-century French politicians